Stuart John Cameron (born May 15, 1939) is a retired Canadian politician and lawyer. He was born in Maple Creek, Saskatchewan, and served in the Legislative Assembly of Saskatchewan from 1975 to 1978, as a Liberal member for the constituency of Regina South.

References

Saskatchewan Liberal Party MLAs
1939 births
Living people
20th-century Canadian legislators